This is a list of political parties in the state of New York.

Statewide parties
Parties with automatic ballot access:

 Conservative Party
 Democratic Party
 Republican Party
 Working Families Party

Parties that formerly had automatic ballot access:

 Green Party (lost ballot access after 2020 election)
 Independence Party (lost ballot access after 2020 election)
 Liberal Party (lost ballot access after the 2002 election)
 Libertarian Party (achieved ballot access in 2018, lost ballot access after 2020 election)
 Reform Party of New York State (2015–present) (lost ballot access after 2018 election)
 Serve America Movement (achieved ballot access after 2018 election, lost ballot access after 2020 election)
 Women's Equality Party (lost ballot access after 2018 election)

Parties without automatic ballot access:
 Communist Party
 Constitution Party
 New York Federalist Party (2011)
 Federalist Party (1791-1824)
 Freedom Party (1994–1998, 2010–present, two ideologically opposite entities)
 Marijuana Reform Party (1998–2002)
 Natural Law Party (1992–2004)
 New Party (1992–1998)
 New York Pirate Party
 Reform Party of New York State (2009–2014)
 New York State Right to Life Party
 Rent Is Too Damn High Party
 Save Jobs Party (2004–2006)
 Socialist Party
 Taxpayers/Federalist Party (2010–2011)
 Sapient

Regional parties
 Black & Asian Democratic Caucus (Monroe County)
 Fix Our Roads Party (Suffolk County) 
 Riverhead First Party (Riverhead Town)
 Rural Heritage Party (Sullivan County)
Sustainable Southold Party (Southold Town)
 Tax Revolt Party (Nassau County)

See also
Political party strength in New York
 Politics of New York (state)
 Lists of political parties

References

New York

Political parties